James Altman is a Catholic priest who received attention in 2020 after appearing in a viral YouTube video. After a dispute over his comments with Bishop William P. Callahan, Altman was later prohibited from celebrating Mass publicly in 2021.

Life

Altman was ordained a Catholic priest in 2008, having previously worked as an attorney before entering Catholic seminary. He previously was assigned to St. Peter and Paul in Wisconsin Rapids, Wisconsin from 2010 to 2017, before being transferred to St. James The Less Parish in La Crosse, Wisconsin. While assigned to St. Peter and Paul, cemetery upkeep went into decline during his tenure, as the cemetery soon found themselves in debt. However, an employee associated with the cemetery stated that she did not consider Altman to be responsible for the financial issues.

In August 2020, in the months before the 2020 United States presidential election, Altman gained attention after appearing in a viral YouTube video. In the video, Altman stated that “You cannot be Catholic and be a Democrat”, due to the party's support of abortion legalization. He encouraged Catholic Democrats to “repent of your support of that party and its platform or face the fires of hell...There will be 60 million aborted babies standing at the gates of heaven barring your Democrat entrance.” Altman also criticized vaccination efforts and restrictions on church gatherings related to COVID-19, the DACA immigration program, and referred to climate change as a "hoax".

Altman's comments were praised by Bishop Joseph Strickland of the Diocese of Tyler, who endorsed his message. Father Dwight D. Longenecker also defended Altman from criticism. Altman was criticized by Father James Martin, though Martin's comments were in turn criticized by Bishop Richard Stika of Knoxville.

In September 2020, Altman's superior, Bishop William P. Callahan stated that he would apply the "Gospel principles to the correction of Fr. Altman."

In May 2021, Altman announced that Callahan had requested his resignation as pastor, and that he would contest the request with the diocese. In July, Callahan issued a decree for the removal of Altman as pastor from St. James the Less Parish. Callahan stated that Altman would remain a priest in the diocese, and continue to be paid, but would no longer be allowed to preach publicly. The day after the La Crosse Catholic Diocese announced Altman's removal as pastor, Altman gave the welcome prayer at the CPAC 2021.

After Altman's removal, Strickland came to his defense again, stating "Fr James Altman is in trouble for speaking the truth. I originally supported him when he spoke bold truth during the election. I continue to support him for speaking the truth in Jesus Christ...Let us pray for him." In September, actor Mel Gibson spoke in support of "canceled" priests, endorsing a coalition which supported Altman, among several several other priests who faced similar circumstances. Gibson later met with Altman over dinner.

Bibliography
 (2021) Let Freedom Ring: A 40-Day Tactical Training for Freedom from the Devil

References

External links
 Sermon:July 2, 2020

Living people
American Roman Catholic priests
Catholicism-related controversies
Year of birth missing (living people)